Sir Edward Everard Rushworth  (23 August 1818 – 10 August 1877) was a British colonial administrator in the 19th century.

He was born in Freshwater, Isle of Wight in 1818 and educated at St John's College, Oxford, graduating BCL in 1840  and DCL in 1844.

He married Amelia Adelaide de les Derniers at St Paul's Cathedral in Halifax, Nova Scotia, on 13 January 1855. Later that
Year he replaced  Hercules Robinson as the Administrator of Montserrat. From 1860 until 1869 he was  Government Secretary to the Court of Polity in British New Guinea when he became Colonial Secretary of Jamaica.
For a few days in January 1877 he was its acting Governor and died there on 10 August that year  from Yellow Fever.

Notes

1818 births
1877 deaths
People from Freshwater, Isle of Wight
Fellows of St John's College, Oxford
Knights Grand Cross of the Order of the Bath
Governors of Jamaica
Colonial Secretaries of Jamaica